Anna Smashnova was the defending champion, but chose not to compete in 2003.

Meghann Shaughnessy won the title, defeating Francesca Schiavone in the final in straight sets.

Draw

Seeds

  Nathalie Dechy (first round)
  Meghann Shaughnessy (winner)
  Clarisa Fernández (second round)
  Dája Bedáňová (first round)
  Francesca Schiavone (final)
  Marie-Gaïané Mikaelian (first round)
  Laura Granville (second round)
  Magüi Serna (quarterfinals)

Finals

Top half

Bottom half

References

2003 WTA Tour
Sports competitions in Canberra
2003 in Australian women's sport
2003 in Australian tennis
2003 in women's tennis